HHPA may stand for:

Hardy Holzman Pfeiffer Associates, American architectural firm
Hexahydrophthalic anhydride, a type of organic acid anhydride
Hoosier Heritage Port Authority